Hercules was a brand of bicycle and motorcycle manufactured in Germany.

The Hercules Company was founded in 1886 to produce bicycles by Carl Marschütz in Nuremberg, Germany and began producing motorcycles in 1904. It was merged with Zweirad Union after being purchased by ZF Sachs in 1963.

In the 1950s and 1960s Sachs was the largest European fabricator of two-stroke motorcycle engines.  Many of these engines were used in the Hercules line of small motorcycles, scooters and mopeds.

In 1974 Hercules became the first company to offer a Wankel-engined motorcycle for sale to the general public. A prototype was first shown in 1970 at the West Cologne Autumn Motorcycle Show to a mixed reception and the production bike was sold as a Hercules product except in the United Kingdom, where it was marketed as a DKW motorcycle. The W-2000 had a single-rotor air-cooled engine of 294cc displacement that produced 23 hp, later increased to 32 hp. Cooling was by  a large fan placed in front of the engine (and the slipstream breeze while riding) and engine lubrication was by manually adding oil to the fuel in the tank.

In 1976 Hercules launched the W-2000 Injection in which engine lubrication was from a separate oil tank via a pump. It had 18-inch wheels, a front disc brake and a rear drum brake. According to a March 1976 review in Cycle World, the handling was good but the bike's low ground clearance limited its cornering ability. That review also declared the W-2000 to be a daily commuting bike, not a sport motorcycle.

Hercules introduced a rotary-powered dirt bike (the KC-30 GS Enduro) in May 1975, but the model failed to sell due to its high price ($2,900).

The Fichtel & Sachs single-rotor engine of 300 cc swept-volume as used in the Hercules – the only commercially available engine at the time – was used as a basis by BSA's project engineer David Garside in the early 1970s when designing a twin-rotor motorcycle engine of 588 cc, which reached production as the "Norton Classic".

Production of motorcycles ceased in 1996.

Partial product line

Hercules K500 1932–1936
Hercules s125 1939–1943
Hercules b50 1932–1935
Hercules Moped, 49cc (1957)
Hercules Scooter, 50cc
Hercules Ultra III Sachs 50 SW
Hercules Lilliput, 98cc
Hercules MK1 moped
Hercules MK2 moped
Hercules MK3 moped
Hercules MK4 moped
Hercules supra 4gp moped
Hercules supra 4 enduro moped
Hercules Prior Moped
Hercules Lastboy
Hercules K100 (1959)
Hercules R 200 (1959)
Hercules 220 (1965)
Hercules 103 (1966)
Hercules Postie Bike (1969)

Hercules K 105 X (1970)
Hercules K 125 X (1971)
Hercules K 50 RX (1971)
Hercules K 125 Military (1971–1990)
Hercules K 125 (1972)
Hercules K 125 T (1973)
Hercules K125 S (1974–1979)
Hercules W-2000 (1974–1978)
Hercules E1 (1974)
Hercules KC-30 GS Enduro (1975)
Hercules 175 GS (1976)
Hercules 502 GS (1976)
Hercules GS250 Ice Racer (1977)
Hercules MC250 (1978)
Hercules DKW 250 GS (1978)
Hercules Prima 5S (1984)
Hercules Prima frisiert
Hercules GS 125B
Hercules KJBe
Hercules K 180 Military (1991–1996)

References

External links 
Hercules Owners' Club

Motorcycles powered by Wankel engines
Motorcycle manufacturers of Germany
Sachs motorcycles